Lana Turner (1921–1995) was an American actress who appeared in over fifty films during her career, which spanned four decades. Discovered in 1937 at age 16, she signed a contract with Warner Bros. but soon transferred to Metro-Goldwyn-Mayer. The studio's co-founder, Louis B. Mayer, helped further her career by casting her in several youth-oriented comedies and musicals, including Dancing Co-Ed (1939) and Ziegfeld Girl (1941), the latter of which was a commercial success and helped establish her as one of the studio's leading performers. Turner subsequently co-starred with Clark Gable in the drama Somewhere I'll Find You (1943), the first of four films she would appear in with him.

Turner's role as a femme fatale in the film noir The Postman Always Rings Twice (1946) advanced her career significantly and established her as a dramatic actress. It earned her acclaim with Bosley Crowther of The New York Times deeming it "the role of her career." In addition to her film roles, Turner frequently appeared on radio programs throughout the 1940s, including Suspense and The Orson Welles Almanac. In 1952, she co-starred in the drama The Bad and the Beautiful (1952) opposite Kirk Douglas, portraying an alcoholic actress. Turner made her final film appearance with Gable in the drama Betrayed (1954). After the critical and commercial failure of Diane (1956), MGM opted not to renew Turner's contract. At the time, her films with the studio had collectively earned over $50 million

In 1957, she took a leading role portraying Constance MacKenzie in 20th Century Fox's Peyton Place, a film adaptation of the Grace Metalious novel of the same name. The film was a major box office success, and Turner earned her first and only Academy Award nomination for Best Actress for her performance. In 1959, she accepted the lead role in Douglas Sirk's remake of Imitation of Life, a drama for Universal Pictures in which she portrayed a struggling stage actress, which was another commercial success at the box office. Turner's final leading role was in 1966's Madame X, for which she earned a David di Donatello award for Best Actress. She spent the majority of the 1970s in semiretirement, appearing in touring stage plays, such as Forty Carats and Bell, Book and Candle. In 1982, she was cast in a recurring guest role on the television soap opera Falcon Crest. She made her final film appearance in the comedy horror film Witches' Brew in 1980.

Film

Unrealized projects

Television

Radio

Stage

Awards and nominations

Notes

References

Sources

External links
 
 Lana Turner filmography at the American Film Institute
 Lana Turner filmography at AllMovie

Actress filmographies
American filmographies
filmography
Lists of awards received by American actor